Langenes is a former municipality in Nordland county, Norway.  The municipality, which existed from 1919 until 1964, encompassed the western shore of the Gavlfjorden in what is now Øksnes Municipality.  It is located on the northern end of the large island of Langøya in the Vesterålen archipelago.  The administrative centre was in the village of Stø, just east of the Langenes Church in the northern part of the municipality.

History
The municipality of Langenes was established on 1 July 1919 when the northeastern part of Øksnes Municipality was split off from Øksnes to form the new municipality.  Initially, Langenes had a population of 1,085.  During the 1960s, there were many municipal mergers across Norway due to the work of the Schei Committee. On 1 January 1963, the Holm area along the Gavlfjorden (population: 65) was transferred from Langenes to Sortland Municipality.  On 1 January 1964, the rest of Langenes (population: 2,037) was merged back together with Øksnes.  Prior to the merger, Langenes had 2,037 residents.

Name
The municipality is named after the old Langenes farm since the first Langenes Church was built there. The island's name, is directly translated as "the long island". The municipality was located on the northernmost peninsula on the island thus the name Langenes means the "headland on Langøya".

Government
While it existed, this municipality was responsible for primary education (through 10th grade), outpatient health services, senior citizen services, unemployment, social services, zoning, economic development, and municipal roads. During its existence, this municipality was governed by a municipal council of elected representatives, which in turn elected a mayor.

Municipal council
The municipal council  of Langenes was made up of representatives that were elected to four year terms.  The party breakdown of the final municipal council was as follows:

See also
List of former municipalities of Norway

References

Øksnes
Former municipalities of Norway
1919 establishments in Norway
1964 disestablishments in Norway